Pefaur (Ventimiglia) Peninsula is the heavily glaciated peninsula projecting 11 km in northwest direction from Danco Coast on the west side of Antarctic Peninsula. Bounded by Hughes Bay to the northeast and Charlotte Bay to the south, and separated from Brabant Island to the northwest by Gerlache Strait. At its northern extremity stand Valdivia Point.

The peninsula is named both by Argentina and Chile, in the latter case for Jaime E. Pefaur, biologist at the University of Chile who worked on board the naval vessel Yelcho during the 1967-68 Chilean Antarctic Expedition.

Location

British mapping in 1978.

Map

 British Antarctic Territory.  Scale 1:200000 topographic map. DOS 610 Series, Sheet W 64 60.  Directorate of Overseas Surveys, Tolworth, UK, 1978.

References
 SCAR Composite Gazetteer of Antarctica.

Peninsulas of Graham Land
Danco Coast